Skamokawa Valley is a census-designated place (CDP) in Wahkiakum County, Washington, north of the town of Cathlamet. The population was 401 as of the 2010 census. The CDP includes the Sleepy Hollow community.  The Skamokawa Valley community is part of the Wahkiakum School District, a K-12 school district of about 430 students. The name of the CDP comes from that of the Wahkiakum Chief Skamokawa who met with Meriwether Lewis and William Clark while their expedition spent the winter of 1805-06 at Fort Clatsop. His name, Skamokawa, is a Chinook word meaning “smoke over the water,” a reference to the area's foggy climate.

Geography
Skamokawa Valley is located at  (46.315246, -123.401355).

According to the United States Census Bureau, the CDP has a total area of 28.41 square miles (73.58 km2), of which, 28.19 square miles (73.02 km2) of it is land and 0.22 square miles (0.56 km2) of it (0.76%) is water.

Demographics

As of the census of 2010, there were 401 people, 159 households, and 104 families residing in the CDP. The population density was 14.1 people per square mile (5.4/km2). There were 200 housing units at an average density of 7.0/sq mi (2.7/km2). The racial makeup of the CDP was 93.8% White, 0.0% African American, 1.0% Native American, 0.2% Asian, 0.0% Pacific Islander, 1.5% from other races, and 3.5% from two or more races. Hispanic or Latino of any race were 2.5% of the population.

There were 159 households, out of which 26.4% had children under the age of 18 living with them, 52.2% were married couples living together, 5.7% had a female householder with no husband present, and 34.6% were non-families. 30.2% of all households were made up of individuals, and 14.4% had someone living alone who was 65 years of age or older. The average household size was 2.52 and the average family size was 3.11.

In the CDP, the age distribution of the population shows 25.7% under the age of 18, 4.0% from 18 to 24, 20.9% from 25 to 44, 33.7% from 45 to 64, and 15.7% who were 65 years of age or older. The median age was 44.5 years. For every 100 females, there were 97.5 males. For every 100 females age 18 and over, there were 102.7 males.

External links
Wahkiakum School District website

References

Census-designated places in Wahkiakum County, Washington
Census-designated places in Washington (state)